Michela Quattrociocche (born 3 December 1988) is an Italian film actress.

Acting career
Quattrociocche made her cinematic debut in the 2008 comedy film Scusa ma ti chiamo amore, directed by Federico Moccia. In this film she played Niki, a free-spirited teenager in her last year of high school who romances a 37-year-old man. She landed the role after her mother sent her pictures to casting; she auditioned for the role while she was taking her high school graduation exams. Following the success of Scusa ma ti chiamo amore, Quattrociocche appeared in other movies directed by Moccia: a cameo in Amore 14, and reprising her role as Niki in Scusa ma ti voglio sposare, the sequel to her first film. She has also appeared in Neri Parenti's 2009 film Natale a Beverly Hills and the 2010 film Una canzone per te.

Personal life
Quattrociocche married Alberto Aquilani on 4 July 2012. Together, they have two daughters: Aurora (b. 18 April 2011) and Diamante (b. 3 November 2014). On 11 May 2020, it was announced that the two had separated.

Filmography

References

External links

1988 births
Italian film actresses
Living people
Actresses from Rome
21st-century Italian actresses